Auplopus architectus is a species of spider wasp of the family Pompilidae.

Description 

The exoskeleton is iridescent, especially within the subspecies A. a. metallicus. The head is black and the wings are usually amber in color.

Habitat 

Mostly wooded areas. Found often near old buildings, but in the wild, nests are built in rock crevasses. In civilized areas, they are found near old buildings. Nests are built in cracks of such buildings. They will nest in other cavities, such as at the back of pipes.

Behavior 

This species is often nervous (energetic), and always on the lookout for prey. If they get into buildings, they are seen at windows with lots of sun.

Nests 

Nests are barrel shaped capsules, made of mud.

Geographic range 

Separate populations in California, the Northeastern U.S., and Arkansas.

References 

Pompilidae